Latvia competed at the 1996 Summer Olympics in Atlanta, United States. 47 competitors, 34 men and 13 women, took part in 47 events in 12 sports.

Medalists

Silver
 Ivans Klementjevs — Canoeing, Men's C-1 1000 metres

Athletics

Men
Track & road events

Field events

Combined events – Decathlon

Women
Track & road events

Field events

Boxing

Men

Canoeing

Slalom

Sprint
Men

Cycling

Road

Track
Time trial

Sprint

Gymnastics

Women

Modern pentathlon

Men

Rowing

Men

Women

Sailing

Men

Women

Shooting

Men

Swimming

Men

Women

Weightlifting

Men

Wrestling

Men's Greco-Roman

References

Nations at the 1996 Summer Olympics
1996 Summer Olympics
1996 in Latvian sport